Proctor Hall (January 1884 – after 1910) was an English footballer. His regular position was as a forward. He was born in Blackburn. He played for various clubs, including Brighton & Hove Albion, Bradford City, Chesterfield and Manchester United.

References

External links
MUFCInfo.com profile
Manchester United profile
Aston Villa profile

1884 births
Footballers from Blackburn
English footballers
Oswaldtwistle Rovers F.C. players
Manchester United F.C. players
Brighton & Hove Albion F.C. players
Aston Villa F.C. players
Bradford City A.F.C. players
Luton Town F.C. players
Chesterfield F.C. players
Hyde United F.C. players
Preston North End F.C. players
Newport County A.F.C. players
Mardy A.F.C. players
Southern Football League players
English Football League players
Year of death missing
Association football inside forwards